Nova Marilândia is a municipality in the state of Mato Grosso in the Central-West Region of Brazil, it is also the closest inhabitance to South America's Pole of inaccessibility

See also
List of municipalities in Mato Grosso

References

Municipalities in Mato Grosso